Günlüce is a village in the Nazımiye District, Tunceli Province, Turkey. The village is populated by Kurds of the Alan tribe and had a population of 65 in 2021.

The hamlet of Aktepe is attached to the village.

References 

Villages in Nazımiye District
Kurdish settlements in Tunceli Province